The India International Trade Fair, ever since its inception in 1980, has evolved as a major event for the business community. It is a premier event organized by the India Trade Promotion Organization, the nodal trade promotion agency of the Government of India. The event is held between 14 and 27 November every year at Pragati Maidan, New Delhi, India.

The Theme of IITF 2013 was Inclusive Growth with Bihar as Partner State and Japan as Partner Country.

Significance
IITF is a major tourist attraction. The annual event provides a common platform for the manufacturers, traders, exporters and importers.
The fair displays comprises a wide range of products and services including automobiles, coir products, jute, textiles, garments, household appliances, kitchen appliances, processed food, beverages, confectionery, pharmaceuticals, chemicals, cosmetics, bodycare & health care products, telecommunication, power sector, electronic sector, furniture, home furnishings, sporting goods, toys, and engineering goods.

The participation figures verify the huge worldwide response of IITF. The 26th edition of IITF (2006) had around 7500 national and 350 international exhibiting companies. The fair attracted a huge audience of more than 3 million general visitors & 2,75,000 business visitors including 91 delegations from 53 countries. In fact, all business avenues will be encouraged to participate, to represent India in its totality and open fresh avenues for major business expansion.

(gross) with 30 States and Union Territories participated in as exclusive pavilions. In this edition 299 foreign companies from 25 foreign countries displayed their products. Around 40,000 domestic business visitors and 63 foreign trade delegations from Afghanistan, Angola, Australia, Bangladesh, Brunei, Burkina Faso, Canada, China, Costa Rica, France, Germany, Ghana, Hong Kong, Iran, Indonesia, Japan, Kenya, Lesotho, Malawi, Malaysia, Mexico, Nepal, Nigeria, Oman had visited the fair. Over one million general visitors visited the fair.

The 36th edition of the popular India International Trade Fair (IITF) was held from 14 to 27 November 2016 at Pragati Maidan, New Delhi. The theme of this fair was Digital India.

Gallery

See also
 Pragati Maidan
 India Trade Promotion Organization

References

External links 

 Indian Trade Promotion Organisation website
 Indian Trade Promotion Organisation Official Video Channel On Veblr
 India International Trade Fair

Foreign trade of India
Trade fairs in India